Lepper may refer to:

 Andrzej Lepper (1954–2011), former Polish deputy prime minister
 David Lepper (born 1945), British politician
 Mark Lepper (born 1944), American psychologist

See also
 Leper, one who suffers from leprosy